Nordermeldorf is a borough in the district of Dithmarschen, in Schleswig-Holstein, Germany.

Geography
Nordermeldorf lies within a marsh and borders upon a polder stretching to the North Sea and passes by the Nationalpark Schleswig-Holsteinisches Wattenmeer.
The borough lies directly on the cross road between Meldorf and Wöhrden.

History
On January 1, 1974, the previously separate boroughs of Barsfleth, Christianskoog und Thalingburen combined to become Nordermeldorf.

References

Dithmarschen